Svein Gaute Hølestøl (born 1 March 1971) is a Norwegian former professional cyclist. He was born in Stavanger. He competed at the 1996 and 2000 Summer Olympics.
He won the 1999 Norwegian National Road Race Championships and the 2000 Norwegian National Time Trial Championships.

References

External links
 

1971 births
Living people
Norwegian male cyclists
Olympic cyclists of Norway
Cyclists at the 1996 Summer Olympics
Cyclists at the 2000 Summer Olympics
Sportspeople from Stavanger